Asso (Valassinese ) is an Italian comune in the province of Como, in Lombardy, Italy.

Main sights
Significant historic buildings are:
 the castle, built in the 12th century; nowadays only the tower is in good condition;
 the main church of John the Baptist, built between 1641 and 1675;
 a few bridges on the river Lambro, including punt de la Fola, punt di Gubitt and ponte Oscuro.

Sister towns
 Saint-Péray, France, since 2001

References

External links 

Cities and towns in Lombardy
Castles in Italy